is a Japanese footballer currently playing as a defender for Azul Claro Numazu.

Career statistics

Club
.

Notes

References

External links

1996 births
Living people
Association football people from Hokkaido
Hokkaido University of Education alumni
Japanese footballers
Association football defenders
J3 League players
Hokkaido Consadole Sapporo players
Azul Claro Numazu players